GMA may refer to:

Broadcasting 
 GMA Network, a Philippine television channel
 GMA Network Inc., a Philippine broadcasting company
 GMA TV, a fake news website which imitated the legitimate GMA News website
 Good Morning America, a morning show on ABC
 Good Morning Australia (1981–92)
 Good Morning Australia (1992–2005) with Bert Newton

Places 
 Greater Manila Area, Philippines
 General Mariano Alvarez, a municipality in the province of Cavite, Philippines

Music 
 Genie Music Awards, an annual music award ceremony in South Korea
 GMA Music, a Philippine record label
 Gospel Music Association
 Golden Melody Awards, an annual music award ceremony in Taiwan
 Good Morning Apocalypse, a 2016 music album by American rock band Heaven Below

Other uses 
 Generalized model aggregation
 German Association for Medical Education
 Glasgow Mid Argyll, a shinty club in Scotland
 Gloria Macapagal Arroyo (born 1947), Filipina politician and former President of the Philippines
 Glycidyl methacrylate
 GMA Artist Center, a talent agency in the Philippines
 Grocery Manufacturers Association
 Intel GMA, a series of integrated graphics processors